Rajpat Singh Doogar (July 14, 1909 - 1990) was an Indian politician from West Bengal. He was a member of the Indian National Congress.

He was Member of the Rajya Sabha for four terms from 1952 to 1972.

He is survived by Shrimati Kamla Doogar and two sons.

References

Rajya Sabha members from West Bengal
1909 births
1990 deaths